Acraea karschi, Karsch's acraea, is a butterfly in the family Nymphalidae. It is found in Nigeria, Cameroon and possibly Angola.

Description

A. karschi Auriv. (56 c) is intermediate between Acraea viviana and Acraea cabira and differs from both in having the hindmarginal spot on the upperside of the forewing narrower, of more uniform breadth and not covering the base of cellule 2. The under surface of the hindwing exactly agrees with that of cabira. Is perhaps, as Eltringham thinks, only a form of cabira. Cameroons and British East Africa.

Biology
The habitat consists of sub-montane forests.

Adult males mud-puddle.

Taxonomy
Acraea karschi is a member of the Acraea bonasia species group; see Acraea.

See also Pierre & Bernaud, 2014

Etymology
The name honours Ferdinand Karsch.

References

External links

Die Gross-Schmetterlinge der Erde 13: Die Afrikanischen Tagfalter. Plate XIII 56 c
Acraea karschi Le Site des Acraea de Dominique Bernaud as a subspecies of Acraea sotikensis
Acraea karschi Image collection

Butterflies described in 1899
karschi
Butterflies of Africa
Taxa named by Per Olof Christopher Aurivillius